BYV refers to the Beet yellows virus. BYV may also refer to:

 Berkshire Young Voices, a youth ensemble run by the Berkshire Maestros
 byv, ISO code for the Medumba language